Prospector station is a station in Prospector, Manitoba, Canada 10 km from The Pas, near the intersection of Manitoba Highway 10 and Manitoba Provincial Road 287 just inside Clearwater Lake Provincial Park.  The station is served by Via Rail's "The Pas-Pukatawagan" line for the Keewatin Railway twice per week in each direction.

References 

Via Rail stations in Manitoba